Shakoor Majid (born 22 November 1965) is a Bangladeshi architect, writer, film maker and photographer. He was awarded Bangla Academy Literary Award 2017 in the travelogue category by the Government of Bangladesh.

Early life and education 
Majid was born in  Mathiura village at Biani Bazar, Sylhet on  22 November 1965 to Abdul Majid and Farida Khatun. He is the eldest of his five brothers and sisters.

Majid had his primary education from Mathiura Model Primary School, SSC (1982) and HSC (1984) from Faujdarhat Cadet College. He was in the merit list in his secondary exam. He graduated in architecture in 1993 from Bangladesh University of Engineering and Technology  (BUET). During his student life he worked as journalist in different newspapers.

Career 
In 1993, Majid along with two other architects had formed a consulting firm, Triangle Consultants. He is also the managing director or CEO of other organizations. He has been serving as a part-time faculty of Ahsanullah University of Science and Technology since 2004.

Personal life
Majid lives in Dhaka with his wife Hosne Ara Jolly and two sons, Ishmam Intesar Majid and Ibon Ibtesham Majid.

References

1965 births
Living people
Bangladesh University of Engineering and Technology alumni
Bangladeshi architects
Bangladeshi male writers
Recipients of Bangla Academy Award